The 1896 Pittsburgh Athletic Club football season  was their seventh season in existence. The team finished with a record of 2–5–3.

Schedule

Game notes

References

Pittsburgh Athletic Club
Pittsburgh Athletic Club football seasons
Pittsburgh Athletic Club football